One third of Elmbridge Borough Council is elected each year, followed by one year without election.

Political control

Leadership
The leaders of the council since 2010 have been:

Council elections
1973 Elmbridge Borough Council election
1976 Elmbridge Borough Council election (New ward boundaries)
1979 Elmbridge Borough Council election
1980 Elmbridge Borough Council election
1982 Elmbridge Borough Council election
1983 Elmbridge Borough Council election
1984 Elmbridge Borough Council election
1986 Elmbridge Borough Council election (Borough boundary changes took place but the number of seats remained the same)
1987 Elmbridge Borough Council election
1988 Elmbridge Borough Council election
1990 Elmbridge Borough Council election
1991 Elmbridge Borough Council election
1992 Elmbridge Borough Council election
1994 Elmbridge Borough Council election
1995 Elmbridge Borough Council election (Borough boundary changes took place but the number of seats remained the same)
1996 Elmbridge Borough Council election
1998 Elmbridge Borough Council election
1999 Elmbridge Borough Council election
2000 Elmbridge Borough Council election (New ward boundaries)
2002 Elmbridge Borough Council election
2003 Elmbridge Borough Council election
2004 Elmbridge Borough Council election
2006 Elmbridge Borough Council election
2007 Elmbridge Borough Council election
2008 Elmbridge Borough Council election
2010 Elmbridge Borough Council election
2011 Elmbridge Borough Council election
2012 Elmbridge Borough Council election
2014 Elmbridge Borough Council election
2015 Elmbridge Borough Council election
2016 Elmbridge Borough Council election (New ward boundaries)
2018 Elmbridge Borough Council election
2019 Elmbridge Borough Council election
2021 Elmbridge Borough Council election
2022 Elmbridge Borough Council election

By-election results

1994-1998

2002-2006

2006-2010

2010-2014

2014-2018

2018-2022

References

External links
Elmbridge Borough Council

 
Council elections in Surrey
Borough of Elmbridge
District council elections in England